The Kotter and Logger oil and gas fields are mid-size fields located in the Netherlands sector of the North Sea, about 40 km west of Den Helder and 107 km north west of Amsterdam. The Kotter and Logger oil fields produced oil from 1984/5 to 2015.

The fields 
The Kotter oil and gas fields are located in Block K18 of the Netherlands sector of the southern North Sea. The gas reservoir is an Upper Rotliegendes sandstone at a depth of 4,217 to 4,337 metres, below Zechstein salt.

The Kotter oil field was discovered by Conoco in August 1980, the Logger oil field in March 1982, and the Kotter gas field in 1992, both also discovered by Conoco.

The properties of the reservoir/ wellhead fluids are:

Development 
The Kotter and Logger oil fields were developed though a number of platform installations. 

Oil from Logger was exported to Kotter. Oil from Kotter was exported to the Helder A platform and the combined flow sent to Amsterdam. Produced gas from both oil fields was flared. The K18-FB gas field adjacent to Kotter is a stranded asset with no gas transportation infrastructure and remains undeveloped. The Logger installation had a water injection capability of up to 4 injection wells. Injection water was transferred from Kotter to Logger through a 19 km 6-inch pipeline.

The Kotter production facility was originally designed for these throughputs.

The Logger installation had a production capacity of 10,000 bbl/d of oil.

The K18 Golf facility aimed to produce 1.0 to 1.4 million cubic metres of gas per day.

The Kotter and Logger fields were originally owned and operated by Conoco until they were taken over by Wintershall. Production ceased in 2015 and the wells and installations were decommissioned and decontaminated. The platforms and jackets were removed from the field in 2019.

See also 

 Helder, Helm and Hoorn oil fields
K7-K12 gas fields
K13 gas fields
K14-K18 gas fields
L10 gas field
L4-L7 gas fields

References 

North Sea
North Sea energy
North Sea
Oil fields in the Netherlands